VRChat is an online virtual world platform created by Graham Gaylor and Jesse Joudrey and operated by VRChat, Inc. The platform allows users to interact with others with user-created 3D avatars and worlds. VRChat is designed primarily for use with virtual reality headsets, such as the Oculus Rift and Oculus Quest series, SteamVR headsets (such as HTC Vive), and Windows Mixed Reality, but is also usable without VR in a "desktop" mode designed for either a mouse and keyboard or gamepad.

VRChat was first released as a Windows application for the Oculus Rift DK1 prototype on January 16, 2014, and was later released to the Steam early access program on February 1, 2017.

Features

VRChats gameplay is similar to that of games such as Second Life and Habbo Hotel. The game is made up of thousands of connected worlds, in which players can interact with each other through virtual avatars. Avatars and worlds are created and uploaded by their users using a software development kit for Unity released alongside the game. Player avatars are capable of supporting lip syncing, eye tracking, and blinking, in addition to mimicking head and hand motion. Trends and variations of avatars spread through the community like memes, and avatars themselves are sold on places like booth.pm or given for free.

VRChat is also capable of running in "desktop mode" without a VR headset, which is controlled using either a mouse and keyboard or a gamepad. Some limitations exist in desktop mode, such as the inability to freely move an avatar's limbs, or perform interactions that require more than one hand.

In 2020, Vrchat introduced Udon, a visual programming language which uses a node graph system. While still considered alpha software, it became usable on publicly-accessible worlds beginning in April 2020. A third-party compiler, UdonSharp, was developed to allow world scripts to be written in C#. In 2022, support for the Open Sound Control (OSC) protocol was added for more advanced interactions with external software and devices.

Trust and safety 
Users of VRChat are classified into various "trust levels", based on factors such as their use of the platform. All users begin at the "Visitor" rank (grey). When prompted to "New User" (blue) rank, they are given the ability to upload their own content using the VRChat SDK. This is followed by "User" (green), "Known User" (orange), "Trusted User" (purple), and friends (yellow). Users can choose to toggle communications, avatars, and avatar features based on their trust level. Additionally, users can gain a "Nuisance" rank (grey) after gaining too many infractions, such as being muted, and having all communications, avatars, and avatar features blocked.

VRChat Plus 
In November 2020, the service announced the VRChat Plus subscription service. On launch, it allows users to display a custom avatar image on their nameplates, increases the number of avatars they can save in their favorites from 50 to 300, grants them an "increased trust rating", and allows them to attach an in-game photo to an invite request. Other exclusive features for subscribers are also in development.

Hardware support
VRChat has extensive support for a large number of PC-compatible VR headsets and accessories, including Oculus, and SteamVR-compatible headsets such as the HTC Vive series and Valve Index. A port of VRChat is also available as a native app for Oculus Quest, which supports cross-platform play with PC users; due to hardware limitations, only maps and avatars optimized within specific constraints can be accessed on the Oculus Quest version.

Finger tracking and gesture recognition is supported on controllers such as the Index Controller and Oculus Touch, allowing users' finger movements to be reflected by their avatar, and hand poses to trigger linked animations (such as a corresponding facial expression). VRChat also supports SteamVR full-body tracking for motion capture of waist and leg motions, typically by using HTC's Vive Tracker peripherals or alternative devices (such as Kinect).

Community
VRChat popularity has been attributed to use by YouTubers and Twitch streamers. VRChat has spawned media such as a weekly newspaper in its forums, and talk shows and podcasts dedicated to a discussion of the game.

After an initial wave of viral popularity upon its release, the platform saw a steady increase in concurrent users with the onset of the COVID-19 pandemic and direct quarantine policies. There were recorded spikes in viewership of VRChat-related Twitch streams in mid-2020 and September 2020. The service reported a record of over 24,000 concurrent users over the Halloween weekend (with over half using it on a VR platform), spurred by holiday events and the recent release of the Oculus Quest 2.

On December 31, 2020, the service recorded a new record of over 40,000 concurrent users for New Year's Eve, to the point that it experienced a major outage around midnight in the Eastern Time Zone due to a security provider having mistaken the surge as a denial-of-service attack.

In popular culture

Ugandan Knuckles

VRChat gave rise to a meme known as "Ugandan Knuckles", in which players use crude in-game models of Knuckles the Echidna from the Sonic the Hedgehog series while repeating the catchphrase "Do you know the way?" in a mock African accent. The players' model and mannerisms originated in a review by YouTuber Gregzilla and Forsen's Twitch stream respectively, in addition to lines from the Ugandan movie Who Killed Captain Alex? This has generated controversy from many sources; Polygons Julia Alexander labelled it "blatantly racist" and a "problematic meme", comparing it to Habbo Hotel raids, and Jay Hathaway of The Daily Dot called it a "racist caricature". The creator of the 3D model used in the meme expressed regret for having made it, and urged players that they "do not use this to bug the users of VRChat."  In response, the developers of the game published an open letter on Medium, stating that they were developing "new systems to allow the community to better self moderate" and asking users to use the built-in muting features.

Music and dance 
The platform has attracted various music-oriented communities and events; dancers have leveraged full-body tracking support to give virtual performances and classes within VRChat, including ballet, breaking, and pole dance.

Online dance music events have also occurred on VRChat, especially since the COVID-19 pandemic. They are organized by collectives such as Loner Online, take place within virtual nightclubs, and sometimes simulcast on live streaming platforms such as Twitch. Loner's world was noted by an NME writer for its attention to detail in recreating an underground club experience, right down to having bathroom stalls.

In June 2020, French electronic musician Jean-Michel Jarre presented a virtual concert experience in VRChat, "Alone Together". On December 31, 2020, Jarre presented a second virtual concert for New Year's Eve, "Welcome to the Other Side", which was broadcast across other radio, television, and online platforms from outside of the Notre-Dame cathedral, and featured an interactive companion experience on VRChat, taking place in a world recreating its interior.

Reception

Safety and security 
In February 2022, a BBC News report accused the service of not providing enough safeguards to prevent minors from entering worlds that may contain adult themes and interactions.

On July 25, 2022, VRChat announced that it would implement Easy Anti-Cheat (EAC) in order to protect against prohibited modifications to the client. The announcement specifically cited griefers using mods designed to crash other users out of VRChat sessions, as well as issues with account hijacking. The announcement led to widespread backlash from the community, citing that some users had legitimate uses for modded clients, mainly to add quality of life (QoL) features that had not yet been added to the software, including additional accessibility features (such as allowing the display of subtitles on video players in worlds). The software was subsequently review bombed on Steam, while some community members urged others to cancel their Plus subscriptions. A spokesperson stated to Motherboard that its introduction of features such as OSC support had "enabled our users to have an entirely new dimension of creativity, as well as the ability to build accessibility tools to fit their needs".

In response to the criticism, VRChat announced that it had amended its development roadmap in order to prioritize the addition of a number of new accessibility and QoL features that had been highly requested by the community, with some being scheduled for shipment by the end of the following week.

See also
AltspaceVR – A platform providing meeting spaces in virtual reality
Sansar – A social virtual reality platform with a near-identical premise
Metaverse – Term for a collective three-dimensional virtual shared space
NeosVR – A massively multiplayer online virtual reality game
High Fidelity – A virtual reality platform featuring an economy built on blockchain
We Met in Virtual Reality - A 2022 documentary film centered on players in VRChat

References

External links
Official website

2014 video games
Massively multiplayer online games
Active massively multiplayer online games
Virtual reality communities
Virtual reality games
Video games with cross-platform play
Windows games
HTC Vive games
Oculus Rift games
Meta Quest games
Early access video games
Free-to-play video games
Video games developed in the United States
Indie video games
Video games with user-generated gameplay content
Social casual games
Video games with cel-shaded animation
First-person video games
First-person shooter multiplayer online games
Obscenity controversies in video games